In mathematics, Abel's irreducibility theorem, a field theory result described in 1829 by Niels Henrik Abel, asserts that if ƒ(x) is a polynomial over a field F that shares a root with a polynomial g(x) that is  irreducible over F, then every root of g(x) is a root of ƒ(x). Equivalently, if ƒ(x) shares at least one root with g(x) then ƒ is divisible evenly by g(x), meaning that ƒ(x) can be factored as g(x)h(x) with h(x) also having coefficients in F.

Corollaries of the theorem include:
 If ƒ(x) is irreducible, there is no lower-degree polynomial (other than the zero polynomial) that shares any root with it. For example, x2 − 2 is irreducible over the rational numbers and has  as a root; hence there is no linear or constant polynomial over the rationals having  as a root. Furthermore, there is no same-degree polynomial that shares any roots with ƒ(x), other than constant multiples of ƒ(x).
 If ƒ(x) ≠ g(x) are two different irreducible monic polynomials, then they share no roots.

References

External links
 Larry Freeman. Fermat's Last Theorem blog: Abel's Lemmas on Irreducibility. September 4, 2008.
 

Field (mathematics)